Meet Him and Die is a 1976 film directed by Franco Prosperi and starring Ray Lovelock, Martin Balsam and Elke Sommer.

Cast
 Ray Lovelock - Massimo Torlani
 Martin Balsam - Giulianelli
 Elke Sommer - Secretary
 Heinz Domez - Piero
 Ettore Manni - Perrone
 Peter Berling - Bavoso
 Riccardo Cucciolla - Commissioner Sacchi
 Ernesto Colli - Settecapelli

Style
Italian film historian Roberto Curti described Meet Him and Die as a turning point for poliziotteschis approach to justice in film as the genre "no longer considers justice"

Release
Meet Him and Die was distributed theatrically in Italy by Over Seas Film Company on 9 October 1976. It grossed a total of 344,182,575 Italian lira domestically.  In West Germany, the film was titled Tote pflastern seinen Weg and was released on 28 July 1977.

On its release on home video in the United Kingdom, the film received the alternative title Risking, Pronto!.

See also 
 List of Italian films of 1976

References

References

External links

1976 films
1970s crime thriller films
1970s Italian-language films
Giallo films
Italian crime thriller films
Films directed by Franco Prosperi
1970s Italian films